Sidney may refer to:

People
 Sidney (surname), English surname
 Sidney (given name), including a list of people with the given name
 Sidney (footballer, born 1972), full name Sidney da Silva Souza, Brazilian football defensive midfielder
 Sidney (footballer, born 1979), full name Sidney Santos de Brito, Brazilian football defender

Characters
Sidney Prescott, main character from the Scream horror trilogy
 Sidney (Ice Age), a ground sloth in the Ice Age film series
Sidney (Pokémon), a character of the Pokémon universe
Sidney, one of The Bash Street Kids
Sidney Jenkins, a character in the British teenage drama Skins
Sidney Hever, Edward's fireman from The Railway Series and the TV series Thomas and Friends
Sidney, a diesel engine from the TV series Thomas and Friends
Sidney Freedman, a recurring character in the TV series M*A*S*H

Places

Canada
Sidney, British Columbia
Sidney, Manitoba

United Kingdom
Sidney Sussex College, Cambridge

United States
Sidney, Arkansas
Sidney, Illinois
Sidney, Indiana
Sidney, Iowa
Sidney, Kentucky
Sidney, Maine
Sidney, Missouri
Sidney, Montana
Sidney, Nebraska
Fort Sidney, a historic fort
Sidney, New Jersey
Sidney, New York, a town
Sidney (village), New York
Sidney, Ohio
Sidney, Texas
Sidney, West Virginia
Sidney, Wisconsin

Other uses
 Sidney (novel), by Margaret Deland
 Sidney (film), a Canadian film

See also
Sidney Township (disambiguation)
Sidnei (disambiguation)
Sydnee (disambiguation)
Sydney (disambiguation)
Sid (disambiguation)
Syd (disambiguation)